ZM447439 is an aurora inhibitor.

References

Protein kinase inhibitors
Quinazolines
4-Morpholinyl compunds
Benzamides